Sakuntala Panda was an Indian writer who wrote in Odia language. She was the daughter of a very famous Mathematics teacher, Late Narayana Pati. She published 15 books of poetry, shortstories and travelogues. She also was the founder and editor of Odia women's monthly Sucharita. She was also editor of odia children's monthly Nandanakanan.

Biography
She was born on 10 November 1939 at Cuttack.

She founded a women's magazine in Odia 1975 and edited it for 28 years. She also edited a children's monthly, Nandankanan. She has published 15 books. She was a member of Odia advisory committee of the National Book Trust and the Kendra Sahitya Akademi. She was also a member of Odia Film Censor Board.

Published works

References

1939 births
2017 deaths
Women writers from Odisha
Writers from Odisha
Poets from Odisha
People from Cuttack